The following are lists of the islands of South America by country.

Argentina

Atlantic Ocean islands
Isla Apipé
Isla Bermejo
Isla de los Estados
Isla de San Martín
Isla del Cerrito
Isla Martín García
Isla Trinidad (Buenos Aires)
Patagonic Archipelago
Archipiélago de Tierra del Fuego
Isla Grande de Tierra del Fuego (divided with Chile)
Isla de los Estados
Islas Malvinas, Georgias y Sandwich del Sur

Lake islands
Isla Huemul
Isla Victoria

River islands
Islands of the Paraná River delta
Islas del Ibicuy

Bolivia

Bolivia is a landlocked country with no ocean islands.

Lake islands
Isla del Pescado (Incahuasi Island)
Isla del Sol
Isla de la Luna

Brazil

Atlantic Ocean islands
Arquipelago de Fernando de Noronha
Arquipélago de São Pedro e São Paulo (Saint Peter and Paul Rocks)
Atol das Rocas (Rocas Atoll)
Ilha de Boipeba
Ilha de Maraca
Ilha da Queimada Grande
Ilha de Santa Bárbara
Ilha de Santa Catarina
Ilha de Santo Amaro
Ilha de São Luís
Ilha Grande
Ilha Itaparica
Ilha Tinhare
Ilha Trindade
Ilha dos Lobos
Ilhabela archipelago
Ilha de São Sebastião
Ilhas Cagarras archipelago
Ilhas Martim Vaz archipelago
Vitória archipelago
Ilha de Vitória

River Islands
Bananal Island
Anavilhanas Archipelago

Fluvial-maritime
Marajó Archipelago
Ilha de Marajó

Chile

Pacific Ocean islands
Archipiélago de Chiloé
Isla de Chiloé
Isla Guafo
Isla Lemuy
Isla Quinchao
Archipiélago de las Guaitecas
Archipiélago Guayaneco
Archipiélago Juan Fernández (also considered part of Oceania)
Isla Alejandro Selkirk
Isla Robinsón Crusoe
Isla Santa Clara
Islote Juananga
Isla Chañaral
Isla de Pascua (Easter Island) (also considered part of Oceania)
Isla del Rey
Isla Magdalena
Isla Mancera
Isla Mocha
Isla Quiriquina
Isla Salas y Gómez
Islas Desventuradas
Isla San Ambrosio
Isla San Félix
Islote González
Roca Catedral
Merino Jarpa Island
Patagonic Archipelago
Archipelago de La Reina Adelaida (Queen Adelaide Archipelago)
Isla Cochrane
Isla Contreras
Isla Juan Guillermo
Isla Pacheco
Isla Ramirez
North Rennell Island
South Rennell Island
Archipiélago de los Chonos
Isla Benjamin
Isla Cuptana
Isla Guamblin
Isla James
Isla Melchor
Isla Rivero
Isla Simpson
Isla Traiguen
Isla Victoria
Archipiélago de Tierra del Fuego
Isla Dawson
Isla Desolación
Isla Gordon
Isla Grande de Tierra del Fuego (divided with Argentina)
Isla Magdalena
Islas Hermite
Isla Hermite
Isla Hornos – location of Cape Horn (Cabo de Hornos)
Isla Hoste
Isla Navarino
Isla Santa Inés
Islas Picton, Lennox y Nueva
Islas Wollaston
Londonderry Island
Isla Angamos
Isla Aracena
Isla Campana
Isla Chatham
Isla Clarence
Isla Diego de Almagro
Isla Duque de York
Isla Esmeralda
Isla Farrel
Isla Guarello
Isla Hanover
Isla Jorge Montt
Isla Juan Guillermos
Isla Madre de Dios
Isla Manuel Rodriguez
Isla Mornington
Isla Patricio Lynch
Isla Pratt
Isla Riesco
Isla Serrano
Isla Stosch
Isla Wellington
Islas Diego Ramírez
Islote Águila (Águila Islet) – southernmost point of Chile
Islas Ildefonso

Lake islands
Isla Gabriela
Isla Guapi
Isla Fresia
Isla Central

River islands
Isla Teja
Isla del Rey
Isla Mancera
Isla Haverbeck
Isla Mota
Isla Guapi
Isla Lemuy
Isla Orrego

Colombia

Caribbean Sea islands
Bolívar Department:

Rosario Islands
Isla Grande
Isla Marina
Isla de Roberto
Isla Rosario
Isla del Tesoro
Fuerte Island
Tierra Bomba Island
Isla del Pirata

Córdoba Department:
Tortuguilla Island

Magdalena Department:
Isla de Salamanca

San Andrés and Providencia Department:

Acuario Cay (also known as Rose Cay)
Alice Shoal
Bajo Nuevo Bank
Bayley Islet
Basalt Islet
Brothers Cay
Crab Cay
Cayos de Albuquerque
North Cay
South Cay
Córdoba Cay (also known as Haynes Cay)
Easy Cay
Grunt Cay
Cayos de Este Sudeste
Bolívar Cay (also known as Courtown or West Cay)
East Cay
Palm Cay
Providencia Island
Quita Sueño Bank
Rocky Cay
Roncador Bank
Roncador Cay
San Andrés Island
Santa Catalina Island
Santander Cay (also known as Cotton Cay)
Serrana Bank
Serranilla Bank
Sucre Islet (also known as Johnny Cay)

Sucre Department:

Boquerón Island
Cabruna Island
Ceycén Island
Mangle Island
Maravilla Island
Múcura Island
Palma Island
Panda Island
Santa Cruz del Islote
Tintipán Island

Pacific Ocean islands
Cauca Department:

Coco Island
Gorgona Island
El Horno Islet
Gorgonilla Island
El Viudo Islet
Micay Island

Chocó Department:
Cacagual Island

Nariño Department:
Sanquianga Island

Valle del Cauca Department:

Ají Island
La Palma Island
Malpelo Island

Lake islands
Boyacá Department:

Lake Tota
Cerro Chiquito Island
Santa Helena Island
San Pedro Island

Nariño Department:

Laguna de la Cocha
La Corota Island

River islands
Amazonas Department:

Baranoa Island
Curvaratá Island
Loreto Island
Porvenir Island
Tigre Island
Yaguas Muñoz Island

Antioquia Department:

Pernambuco Island

Bolívar Department:

Margarita Island
Tigrera Island
Venezuela Island

Caquetá Department:

Aduché Island

Chocó Department:

Grande del Atrato Island

Magdalena Department:

Zura Island

Santander Department:

Grande Island

Vichada Department:

Aceitico Island
Manatí Island

Ecuador

Pacific Ocean islands
Galápagos Islands (also considered part of Oceania)
Puná Island

Falkland Islands

Atlantic Ocean islands
Falkland Islands (also claimed by Argentina)
West Falkland
East Falkland
Jason Islands

French Guiana

 Îles du Salut
 Île du Diable
 Île Royale
 Île Saint-Joseph
 Constable Islands
 Remire Islands
 Îlet la Mère
 Palasisi, island in the Litani River
 Île Portal, island in the Maroni River

Guyana

Paraguay

Paraguay is a landlocked country with no ocean islands and only a few very small inland islands.

Peru

South Georgia and the South Sandwich Islands

Atlantic Ocean islands
 South Georgia (also claimed by Argentina)
 Bird Island, South Georgia
 South Sandwich Islands (also claimed by Argentina)

Suriname

Diitabiki
Kasuela
Kwana Island
Langatabiki
Manlobi
Nason
Stoelmanseiland
Stoneiland

Uruguay

Brazilian Island
Gorriti Island
Juncal Island
Isla de Flores
Isla de las Gaviotas
Isla de Lobos
Timoteo Domínguez Island
Vizcaíno Island

Venezuela

Caribbean Sea islands

Archipiélago Las Aves
Isla La Blanquilla
Archipiélago Los Monjes
Archipiélago Los Roques
Isla de Aves
Isla de Coche
Isla de Cubagua
Isla de Patos
Isla de Toas
Isla de Zapara
Isla La Orchila
Isla La Sola
Isla La Tortuga
Isla Margarita
Isla San Carlos
Islas Caracas
Islas los Frailes
Islas los Hermanos
Islas los Testigos

River islands
Ankoko Island (also claimed by Guyana)

See also

List of islands by area
List of islands by highest point
List of islands by population
List of islands in lakes
List of river islands
List of islands in the Atlantic Ocean
List of Caribbean islands
List of islands in the Pacific Ocean
Topic outline of South America

References

External links

Island Directory @ United Nations Environment Programme

World island information @ WorldIslandInfo.com

South America
Islands